Caricea alma is a species of house flies, etc. in the family Muscidae.

References

Further reading

External links

 

Muscidae
Insects described in 1826